Stillwell Island is a small, steep rocky island,  in diameter, which is the largest member of the Way Archipelago. Discovered by the Australasian Antarctic Expedition (1911–14) under Douglas Mawson. He named it for Frank L. Stillwell, geologist with the expedition whose detailed survey included this coastal area.

See also 
 List of Antarctic and sub-Antarctic islands

Islands of George V Land